Allan L. Reiss is a pioneer in psychiatry, behavioral neurogenetics, neuroimaging and medical-related research. 

Reiss has been recognized by various medical boards with awards, prizes and places on committees. These include: the 1981 Merck Academic Achievement Award from George Washington University School of Medicine, the Johns Hopkins University School of Medicine’s 1987 Clinician Scientist Award,  the 1988 American College of Neuropsychopharmacology Travel Award, the Faculty Teaching Award from Johns Hopkins University School of Medicine Division of Child Psychiatry in 1990, George Washington University School of Medicine's Distinguished Alumni Achievement Award in 1998 and the Spirit of Excellence Award for Lifetime Achievements from the National Fragile X Foundation in 2004. In 2005, he received the George Tarjan Award for Contributions in Developmental Disabilities from the American Academy of Child & Adolescent Psychiatry and the Ruane Prize for Outstanding Achievement in Child and Adolescent Psychiatric Research, Brain and Behavior Research Foundation in the same year. Then in 2012, Reiss received the Distinguished Professional Award from America's Turner Syndrome Society and four years later, the Agnes Purcell McGavin Award for Distinguished Career Achievement in Child and Adolescent Psychiatry from the American Psychiatry Association. 

In 2009 Reiss was elected to the National Academy of Medicine.

References

Year of birth missing (living people)
Living people
American psychiatrists
Members of the National Academy of Medicine